Aporosa fusiformis is a species of plant in the family Phyllanthaceae. It is endemic to Sri Lanka.

References

fusiformis
Critically endangered plants
Endemic flora of Sri Lanka
Taxonomy articles created by Polbot